is a traditional Japanese noodle bowl dish eaten on ōmisoka (New Year's Eve, 31 December).

This custom lets go of hardship of the year because soba noodles are easily cut while eating.

History
The tradition started around the Edo period (1603-1867), and there are several traditions that long soba noodles symbolize a long life. The buckwheat plant can survive severe weather during its growth period, and so soba represents strength and resilience.

See also
Ōmisoka, the Japanese New Year's Eve
Japanese cuisine

References

Soba
Holiday foods
Japanese noodle dishes